Shipibo (also Shipibo-Conibo, Shipibo-Konibo) is a Panoan language spoken in Peru and Brazil by approximately 26,000 speakers. Shipibo is an official language of Peru.

Dialects

Shipibo has three attested dialects:

 Shipibo and Konibo (Conibo), which have merged
 Kapanawa of the Tapiche River, which is obsolescent

Extinct Xipináwa (Shipinawa) is thought to have been a dialect as well, but there is no linguistic data.

Phonology

Vowels

 In connected speech, two adjacent vowels may be realized as a rising diphthong.

Nasal
 The oral vowels  are phonetically nasalized  after a nasal consonant, but the phonological behaviour of these allophones is different from the nasal vowel phonemes .
 Oral vowels in syllables preceding syllables with nasal vowels are realized as nasal, but not when a consonant other than  intervenes.

Unstressed
 The second one of the two adjacent unstressed vowels is often deleted.
 Unstressed vowels may be devoiced or even elided between two voiceless obstruents.

Consonants

  are bilabial, whereas  is labialized velar.
  is most typically a fricative , but other realizations (such as an approximant , a stop  and an affricate ) also appear. The stop realization is most likely to appear in word-initial stressed syllables, whereas the approximant realization appears most often as onsets to non-initial unstressed syllables.
  are alveolar , whereas  is dental .
 The  distinction can be described as an apical–laminal one.
  is velar, whereas  is palatal.
 Before nasal vowels,  are nasalized  and may be even realized close to nasal stops .
  is realized as  before , as  before  and as  before . It does not occur before .
  is a very variable sound:
 Intervocalically, it is realized either as continuant, with or without weak frication ( or ).
 Sometimes (especially in the beginning of a stressed syllable) it can be realized as a postalveolar affricate , or a stop-appproximant sequence .
 It can also be realized as a postalveolar flap .

References

Bibliography

 Campbell, Lyle. (1997). American Indian languages: The historical linguistics of Native America. New York: Oxford University Press. .
 Elias-Ulloa, Jose (2000). El Acento en Shipibo (Stress in Shipibo). Thesis. Universidad Nacional Mayor de San Marcos, Lima - Peru.
 Elias-Ulloa, Jose (2005). Theoretical Aspects of Panoan Metrical Phonology: Disyllabic Footing and Contextual Syllable Weight. Ph. D. Dissertation. Rutgers University. ROA 804 .
 Fleck, David W. (10 October 2013). Panoan Languages and Linguistics (PDF). Anthropological Papers of the American Museum of Natural History (no. 99). .
 Kaufman, Terrence. (1990). Language history in South America: What we know and how to know more. In D. L. Payne (Ed.), Amazonian linguistics: Studies in lowland South American languages (pp. 13–67). Austin: University of Texas Press. .
 Kaufman, Terrence. (1994). The native languages of South America. In C. Mosley & R. E. Asher (Eds.), Atlas of the world's languages (pp. 46–76). London: Routledge.
 Loriot, James and Barbara E. Hollenbach. 1970. "Shipibo paragraph structure."  Foundations of Language 6: 43-66.  (This was the seminal Discourse Analysis paper taught at SIL in 1956-7.)
 Loriot, James, Erwin Lauriault, and Dwight Day, compilers. 1993. Diccionario shipibo - castellano.  Serie Lingüística Peruana, 31. Lima: Ministerio de Educación and Instituto Lingüístico de Verano. 554 p. (Spanish zip-file available online http://www.sil.org/americas/peru/show_work.asp?id=928474530143&Lang=eng)  This has a complete grammar published in English by SIL only available through SIL.

External links

 Shipibo-Conibo at Ethnologue
 Lengua Shipibo at Proel
 Shipibo-Conibo (Intercontinental Dictionary Series)

Panoan languages
Languages of Peru
Languages of Brazil
Indigenous languages of Western Amazonia